Kunwar Vikram Singh alias Nati Raja belongs to Chhatarpur royal family. He is a member of the Madhya Pradesh Legislative Assembly, elected from the newly formed constituency of Rajnagar, in Madhya Pradesh, India in 2008. He fought election from Indian National Congress. He won this seat once again against Shankar Pratap Singh Bundela, who was the Bahujan Samaj Party (BSP) candidate instead of Indian National Congress (INC).

In 2003 Assembly Election Vikram Singh, alias Nati Raja, was the SP candidate for Chhatarpur constituency. In this election he defeated Shankar Pratap Singh Bundela of INC.

Timeline

References

Indian National Congress politicians
Madhya Pradesh MLAs 2003–2008
Madhya Pradesh MLAs 2008–2013
People from Chhatarpur district
Samajwadi Party politicians
1970 births
Living people
Indian National Congress politicians from Madhya Pradesh